The following is a list of web browsers that are notable.

Historical

Layout engines 

 Gecko is developed by the Mozilla Foundation.
 Goanna is a fork of Gecko developed by Moonchild Productions.
 Servo is an experimental web browser layout engine being developed cooperatively by Mozilla and Samsung. In 2020 the engine's development was transferred to the Linux Foundation.
 Presto was developed by Opera Software for use in Opera. Development stopped as Opera transitioned to Blink.
 Trident is developed by Microsoft for use in the Windows versions of Internet Explorer 4 to Internet Explorer 11.
 EdgeHTML is the engine developed by Microsoft for Edge. It is a largely rewritten fork of Trident with all legacy code removed.
 Tasman was developed by Microsoft for use in Internet Explorer 5 for Macintosh.
 KHTML is developed by the KDE project.
 WebKit is a fork of KHTML by Apple Inc. used in Apple Safari, and formerly in Chromium and Google Chrome.
 Blink is a 2013 fork of WebKit's WebCore component by Google used in Chromium, Google Chrome, Microsoft Edge, Opera, and Vivaldi.

Graphical 
Current and maintained projects are listed in boldface.

Trident shells 

Other software publishers have built browsers and other products around Microsoft's Trident engine. The following browsers are all based on that rendering engine:
 360 Secure Browser
 AOL Explorer 
 Bento Browser (built into Winamp)
 Deepnet Explorer 
 GreenBrowser 
 Internet Explorer 
 MediaBrowser 
 MSN Explorer 
 NeoPlanet 
 NetCaptor 
 RealPlayer
 Tencent Traveler

Gecko-based 

 Camino for Mac OS X (formerly Chimera) 
 Conkeror, keyboard-driven browser
 Galeon, GNOME's old default browser 
 K-Meleon for Windows
 K-MeleonCCF ME for Windows (based on K-Meleon core, mostly written in Lua)
 K-Ninja for Windows (based on K-Meleon)
 MicroB (for Maemo)
 Minimo (for mobile)
 Mozilla Firefox (formerly Firebird and Phoenix)
 AT&T Pogo (based on Firefox)
 Cliqz, a fork of the Firefox web browser
 CometBird, an optimized fork of Firefox 
 Comodo IceDragon (Firefox-based web browser for Windows)
 Flock (was based on Firefox until version 2.6.1, and based on Chromium thereafter)
 Iceweasel, Debian's Firefox rebrand 
 GNU IceCat, GNU's fork of Firefox
 Netscape Browser 8 to Netscape Navigator 9 
 TenFourFox (Firefox port to PowerPC versions of Mac OS X)
 Timberwolf, AmigaOS' Firefox rebrand 
 Tor Browser, patched Firefox ESR for browsing in Tor anonymity network
 Swiftfox (processor-optimised builds based on Firefox)
 Swiftweasel (processor-optimised builds based on Iceweasel)
 Waterfox (Firefox-based web browser for Windows, macOS, and Linux)
 xB Browser (formerly XeroBank Browser and Torpark), portable browser for anonymous browsing, originally based on Firefox
 Firefox for mobile (codenamed Fennec)
 Mozilla Application Suite 
 Beonex Communicator (separate branch, based on Mozilla Application Suite) 
 Classilla (an updated fork of the Suite to Mac OS 9) 
 Gnuzilla GNU's fork
 Netscape (Netscape 6 to 7, based on Mozilla)
 SeaMonkey (successor to Mozilla Application Suite)
 Iceape Debian's Seamonkey rebrand 
 Skyfire (for mobile) 
 SlimBrowser
 Yahoo! Browser (or partnership browsers e.g. "AT&T Yahoo! Browser"; "Verizon Yahoo! Browser"; "BT Yahoo! Browser", etc.)

Goanna-based 
 Basilisk – similar to Pale Moon, but with the interface of Firefox 29–56 and a few other differences
 K-Meleon – starting from version 77 (2019)
 Pale Moon – a fork of Firefox that maintains support for XUL/XPCOM extensions and retains the user interface of the Firefox 4–28 era

Gecko- and Trident-based 

Browsers that use both Trident and Gecko include:
 K-Meleon with the IE Tab extension 
 Mozilla Firefox with the IE Tab extension
 Netscape Browser 8

Webkit- and Trident-based 
 GNOME Web
 Maxthon (up until version 4.2)
 QQ browser

Blink- and Trident-based 
 Baidu Browser 
 Maxthon (since version 4.2)

Gecko-, Trident-, and Blink-based 
Browsers that can use Trident, Gecko and Blink include:
 Avant Browser
 Lunascape

KHTML-based 

 Konqueror
 Konqueror Embedded

Presto-based 

 Internet Channel (for Wii console, Opera-based)
 Nintendo DS Browser (Opera-based)
 Opera (for releases up until 12.18)

WebKit-based

Blink-based 
 Chromium
 Amazon Silk
 Avast Secure Browser
 Blisk
 Brave
 Cốc Cốc
 Comodo Dragon
 Epic
 Google Chrome (based on Blink since Chrome v. 28)
  JioPages
 Microsoft Edge
 Opera
  Opera GX
 Puffin Browser
 Redcore
 RockMelt
 Sleipnir
 SRWare Iron
 Torch
 Ungoogled-chromium
 qutebrowser (Blink backend mostly stable)
 Vivaldi
 NAVER Whale
 Yandex Browser
 Qt WebEngine
 Dooble (from Version 2.2)
 Falkon

EdgeHTML-based 
 Microsoft Edge (formerly using EdgeHTML, now using Blink)

For Java platform 

 BOLT Browser 
 HotJava 
 Opera Mini
 Teashark 
 ThunderHawk

Specialty browsers 

Browsers created for enhancements of specific browsing activities.

Current 

 SpaceTime (Search the web in 3D)
 ZAC Browser (For children with autism, autism spectrum disorders such as Asperger syndrome, pervasive developmental disorders (PDD), and PDD-NOS)

Discontinued

 Flock (To enhance social networking, blogging, photo-sharing, and RSS news-reading)
 Ghostzilla (Blends into the GUI to hide activity)
 Gollum browser (Created specially for browsing Wikipedia)
 Kirix Strata (Designed for data analytics)
 Miro (A media browser that integrates BitTorrent add-on)
 Nightingale (open source audio player and web browser based on the Songbird (see below) media player source code)
 Prodigy Classic (Executable only within the application)
 RockMelt (Designed to combine web browsing, and social activities such as Facebook and Twitter into a unified one window experience)
 Songbird (browser with advanced audio streaming features and built-in media player with library.)

Mosaic-based 
Mosaic was the first widely used web browser. The National Center for Supercomputing Applications (NCSA) licensed the technology and many companies built their own web browser on Mosaic. The best known are the first versions of Internet Explorer and Netscape.

 AMosaic 
 IBM WebExplorer 
 Internet Explorer 1.x 
 Internet in a Box 
 Mosaic-CK 
 Netscape 
 Spyglass Mosaic 
 VMS Mosaic

Others 

 Abaco (for Plan 9 from Bell Labs and Linux) 
 Amaya 
 Arachne (for DOS and Linux) 
 Arena 
 Ariadna (AMSD Ariadna) (first Russian web browser) 
 AWeb (AmigaOS)
 Baidu Mobile Browser
 Charon (for Inferno)
 Dillo (for lower-end computers)
 DR-WebSpyder (for DOS) 
 Embrowser (for DOS) 
 Flow browser
 Gazelle (from Microsoft Research, OS-like)
 IBrowse (for AmigaOS)
 Mothra (for Plan 9 from Bell Labs)
 NetPositive (for BeOS)
 NetSurf (an open source web browser originally for RISC OS and GTK, e.g. Linux, Windows and more platforms, written in C)
 Phoenix, a browser based on tkWWW
 Planetweb browser  (for Dreamcast)
 Qihoo 360 mobile browsers
 tkWWW, based on Tcl
 Voyager (for AmigaOS)

Mobile browsers 

 Amazon Silk
 Apple Safari
 Brave
 Dolphin browser
 Firefox Focus
 Google Chrome
 Microsoft Edge
 Mozilla Firefox
 Opera Mobile
 Puffin Browser
 QQ browser
 Samsung Internet
 UC Browser
 Vivaldi

Text-based 

 Emacs/W3
 EWW
 Line Mode Browser
 Links
 ELinks
 Lynx
 w3m

See also 
 History of the web browser
 Timeline of web browsers
 Comparison of web browsers
 Comparison of browser engines
 List of search engines
 List of web browsers for Unix and Unix-like operating systems
 Usage share of web browsers
 Browser wars

References

External links 
 Adrian Roselli, evolt.org Browser Archive (2004). List and archive of many current and obsolete web browsers.
 Daniel R. Tobias, Brand-X Browsers (2002).
 Michael Bernadi, DOS Applications for Internet Use (2006).

Web browsers
Web browsers